Diego Sehnem Viana (born 5 May 1983) is a Brazilian footballer who plays for Avaí as a striker.

External links

1983 births
Living people
Brazilian footballers
FC Lustenau players
SpVgg Greuther Fürth players
SV Grödig players
SC Wiener Neustadt players
Associação Portuguesa de Desportos players
Avaí FC players
Campeonato Brasileiro Série A players
Brazilian expatriate footballers
Expatriate footballers in Austria
Expatriate footballers in Germany
Association football forwards